This is a list of educational institutions in the Indian city of Rourkela, Odisha.

Schools

 Guru Nanak Public School, Sector-21, Nayabazar, Rourkela (English Medium)
Loreto English School,civil township, Rourkela 
 Desouza's School
 Indo English School, Birsa Dahar Road
 Ispat English Medium School
 Kendriya Vidyalaya Rourkela, Sector-6
 Pragati Vidya Mandir, Jagda
 Saraswati Vidya Mandir, Birsa Dahar Road (English Medium)
 Rourkela Higher Secondary School, Sector -4 & Sector -7
 Saint Arnold School, Kalunga, Rourkela
 Saint Paul's School, Hamirpur, Rourkela
 Carmel School, Hamirpur, Rourkela
 Guru Tegh Bahadur Public School, Sector-18, Rourkela
 Gyanjyoti Public School, Sector-19, Rourkela
 Delhi Public School, Sector-14, Rourkela
 Deepika E.M. School, Sector-5, Rourkela
 Shri Aurobindo School, Sector-5, Rourkela
 Saint Thomas School, Chhend, Rourkela
 Kalinga Public School, Sector-2, Rourkela
 Kanak Manjari International School, Chhend, Rourkela
 Saint Gregorious School, Kalunga, Rourkela
 Saint Joseph's Convent School, Hamirpur, Rourkela

Colleges

 National Institute of Technology, Rourkela
 Padmanava College of Engineering, Rourkela
 Purushottam School of Engineering and Technology, Mandiakudar
 Rourkela Institute of Management Studies, Rourkela
 Rourkela Institute of Technology, Kalunga
Rourkela College, Rourkela -2 (Sector-4)
Rourkela Govt. Auto. College, Panposh 
S. G. Women's College, Rourkela (Sector-2)
Ispat Auto. College, Rourkela 
Municipal College, Rourkela 
H. K. Ray College, Chhend
Neelashaila Mahavidyalaya, Jagda 
Kalyani Ray College, Rourkela 
Gandhi Mahavidyalaya, Rourkela 
Priyadarshini Women's College, Rourkela 
College Of Arts Science and Technology, Bondamunda
Gayatri +3 Science and commerce college, Rourkela
Chaitanya college, chikatmati, Rourkela

Universities

Biju Patnaik University of Technology
National Institute of Technology, Rourkela

See also
 List of institutions of higher education in Odisha
 List of schools in Odisha

Rourkela
+